Shuko Aoyama and Chang Kai-chen were the defending champions but Chang chose not to participate.  Aoyama successfully defended the title alongside Vera Dushevina, defeating Eugenie Bouchard and Taylor Townsend in the final, 6–3, 6–3.

Seeds
The top seeds received a bye into the quarterfinals.

Draw

Draw

References
General

Citi Open - Women's Doubles